Presidential elections were held in Cameroon on 7 October 2018.

Background
The previous presidential elections on 9 October 2011 saw incumbent president Paul Biya elected for another seven-year term following a 2008 constitutional amendment that removed term limits, allowing Biya to run again. Going into the 2018 elections, Cameroon experienced unrest in the English-speaking portions of the country where separatists have attempted to create the state of Ambazonia. The worst of the unrest occurred in Manyu where several Western countries issued travel warnings to their citizens. The Social Democratic Front, a party that traditionally performs well in the English-speaking portions of the country, has been vocal in their criticism of the handling of the unrest. Biya has responded to the unrest by stating that he would like to see faster progress made on decentralization reforms that were begun in 2010 so that local regions would have more self governance.

On 15 June 2018, the BBC obtained a copy of a letter from Paul Biya to the leader of Cameroon's Senate, appearing to request that the elections be postponed until October 2019. In July, President Biya announced that the election would be held on October 7, 2018.

Electoral system
The President of Cameroon is elected by first-past-the-post voting; the candidate with the most votes is declared the winner with no requirement to achieve a majority.

Candidates

Accepted
Garga Haman Adji, leader of the Alliance for Democracy and Development
Paul Biya, incumbent president and candidate for the Cameroon People's Democratic Movement
Maurice Kamto, candidate for the Cameroon Renaissance Movement
Cabral Libii, journalist and law professor at University of Yaoundé II; candidate for Univers
Serge Espoir Matomba, Douala city councilman and leader of United People for Social Renovation
Akere Muna, candidate for Now!
Frankline Njifor Afanwi, candidate for the National Citizens' Movement of Cameroon
Adamou Ndam Njoya, candidate for the Cameroon Democratic Union
Joshua Osih, selected as the Social Democratic Front candidate on 24 February 2018

Did not run
Samuel Eto'o; the former footballer was rumoured to be considering running.
Dieudonné M'bala M'bala, French comedian of Cameroonian descent
Bernard Muna 
Bernard Njonga; leader of Believe in Cameroon

Results

Aftermath
On 28 January 2019 Maurice Kamto was arrested in Douala while at a supporter's house.

References

Presidential elections in Cameroon
Cameroon
2018 in Cameroon
October 2018 events in Africa